Harvey Call Cobbs Jr. (January 30, 1911 – September 21, 1971) was an American jazz pianist, electric harpsichordist, and organist. He is remembered for his work with saxophonist Albert Ayler in the mid- and late-1960s.

Early life
Cobbs was born in Urbana, Ohio, to Harvey Call Cobbs Sr. and Ethel Hill Cobbs. His father, known as Harry Cobbs, was a church janitor. In his youth, Cobbs served as companion and guide to the pianist Art Tatum and later accompanied Billie Holiday and replaced Hampton Hawes in the band of Wardell Gray.

Career 
Cobbs worked and recorded with the alto saxophonist Johnny Hodges in 1954, when Hodges' band included John Coltrane. He studied the Schillinger System of musical composition.

He is best remembered for his work with the free jazz saxophonist Albert Ayler from 1964 through 1970, playing piano, rocksichord, and electronic organ in live performances and recordings. He also acted as Ayler's copyist and musical director. When Ayler's body was found floating in the East River in New York City on November 25, 1970, Cobbs was called upon to identify the body.

Death 
Cobbs was killed in a hit and run collision on September 21, 1971. He died at Jacobi Medical Center in The Bronx at the age of 60.

Discography
With Albert Ayler
Swing Low Sweet Spiritual (Osmosis, 1964 [1971])
Spirits Rejoice (ESP-Disk, 1965)
Love Cry (Impulse!, 1967)
New Grass (Impulse!, 1969)
Nuits de la Fondation Maeght Vols. 1 & 2 (Shandar, 1970)
Holy Ghost: Rare & Unissued Recordings (1962–70) ( Revenant, 2004)
Live on the Riviera (ESP-Disk, 2005)
With John Coltrane
First Giant Steps. Rare Live Recordings
With Johnny Hodges
The Blues (Norgran, 1952–54, [1955])
Used to Be Duke (Norgran, 1954)
With Jack McVea
Two Timin' Baby (Juke Box Lil)
With Jimmy Rushing
1946–1953 (Jazz Classics)

References

Sources
[ Call Cobbs: Credits]. Allmusic. Accessed July 2, 2007.
"Final Bar." Downbeat, November 11, 1971: p. 9.

1911 births
1971 deaths
People from Urbana, Ohio
African-American pianists
American jazz organists
American male organists
American jazz pianists
American male pianists
American jazz keyboardists
Road incident deaths in New York City
Pedestrian road incident deaths
20th-century American pianists
20th-century organists
Jazz musicians from Ohio
20th-century American male musicians
American male jazz musicians
20th-century African-American musicians